Cho Hey-jin (born 25 September 1973) is a South Korean former basketball player who competed in the 2004 Summer Olympics.

References

1973 births
Living people
South Korean women's basketball players
Olympic basketball players of South Korea
Basketball players at the 2004 Summer Olympics
People from Suwon
Asian Games medalists in basketball
Basketball players at the 1994 Asian Games
Basketball players at the 1998 Asian Games
Asian Games gold medalists for South Korea
Asian Games bronze medalists for South Korea
Medalists at the 1994 Asian Games
Medalists at the 1998 Asian Games
Sportspeople from Gyeonggi Province